The Women's War (German: Der Weiberkrieg) is a 1928 German silent film directed by Franz Seitz and starring Fritz Kampers, Liane Haid and Lotte Lorring. It is based upon the play by Ludwig Anzengruber.

It was made at the Emelka Studios in Munich for release by Bavaria Film. The film's sets were designed by the art director August Rinaldi.

Cast
 Fritz Kampers as Der Gelbhofbauer  
 Liane Haid as Josefa, seine Frau  
 Lotte Lorring as Liesel, Kellnerin  
 Hans Albrecht as Der Altlechner  
 Henriette Speidel as Die Altlechnerin 
 Heinz Könecke as Der junge Altlechner  
 Erta Linde as Reserl, Seine Frau  
 Ferdinand Martini as Der Steinklopferhans  
 Josef Eichheim as Der Brenninger  
 Johanna Schwarz as Die Brenningerin

References

Bibliography
Thomas Elsaesser & Michael Wedel. A Second Life: German Cinema's First Decades. Amsterdam University Press, 1996.

External links

1928 films
Films of the Weimar Republic
Films directed by Franz Seitz
German silent feature films
Films based on works by Ludwig Anzengruber
Films set in the Alps
German black-and-white films
Bavaria Film films
Films shot at Bavaria Studios